Brokaw is a surname.

Brokaw may also refer to:

Brokaw, Wisconsin a village in Marathon County, Wisconsin
Brokaw Bullet, a two-seat sports airplane designed in the United States for amateur construction

See also
Brokaw-McDougall House a historic mansion in Tallahassee, Florida Built in 1856
Brokaw Site a location off of U.S. Route 40 in Richland Township west of St. Clairsville, Ohio
Brokaw bandgap reference, a voltage reference circuit widely used in integrated circuits, with an output voltage around 1.25 V